Kothapeta revenue division is a proposed administrative division in the Konaseema district of the Indian state of Andhra Pradesh. The division awaits a final notification from the Government of Andhra Pradesh and would become one of the resultant three revenue divisions in the district. It is proposed to comprise seven mandals under its administration. Kothapeta is the divisional headquarters.

Administration 
There are 7 mandals proposed to comprise Kothapeta revenue division.

See also 
 List of revenue divisions in Andhra Pradesh
 List of mandals in Andhra Pradesh

References 

Revenue divisions in Konaseema district